Sanchai and Sonchat Ratiwatana were the defending champions but chose not to defend their title.

Chen Ti and Ben McLachlan won the title after defeating Jarryd Chaplin and Luke Saville 2–6, 7–6(7–1), [10–1] in the final.

Seeds

Draw

References
 Main Draw

Gwangju Open - Doubles
Gwangju Open